São Gonçalo, named after Gonçalo de Amarante (1187-1259), may refer to:

Places

Brazil
São Gonçalo, Rio de Janeiro
São Gonçalo do Amarante, Rio Grande do Norte
São Gonçalo do Amarante, Ceará
São Gonçalo do Abaeté, Minas Gerais
São Gonçalo dos Campos, Bahia
São Gonçalo do Gurguéia, Piauí
São Gonçalo do Pará, Minas Gerais
São Gonçalo do Piauí, Piauí
São Gonçalo do Rio Abaixo, Minas Gerais
São Gonçalo do Rio Preto, Minas Gerais
São Gonçalo do Sapucaí, Minas Gerais
São Gonçalo Channel
São Gonçalo River

Portugal
São Gonçalo (Funchal), Madeira

Other uses
Convent of São Gonçalo (Angra do Heroísmo), Terceira, Azores
Igreja de São Gonçalo, a church in Amarante, Portugal
São Gonçalo Futebol Clube (RN), a Brazilian football club, São Gonçalo do Amarante, Rio Grande do Norte

See also

Gonçalo